That's Exactly What I Wanted ... Exactly That is a 2007 EP by Wheat that preceded the release of their fourth album, Everyday I Said a Prayer for Kathy and Made a One Inch Square.

Track listing
All songs written by Wheat (Brendan Harney and Scott Levesque).

What Everyone Keeps Telling Me – 2:55
Little White Dove – 3:37
Until It Takes – 3:52
That's Exactly What I Wanted ... Exactly That – 1:47
Washing Machine Blues – 2:56

Production notes 

Recorded at Electric Ali (Fairhaven, Mass.); additional recording by Wheat at home. Mixed by Rick Lescault. Mastered by Jeff Lipton at Peerless Mastering (Boston, Mass.).

References

Wheat (band) albums
2007 EPs